"Try Honesty" is the debut single by Canadian group Billy Talent. It was released in July 2003 as the lead single from their debut self-titled album.

Music video 
The music video for "Try Honesty," which was directed by Sean Michael Turrell, features the band playing in the Whitby Psychiatric Hospital in Whitby, Ontario. The video hints that the hospital is haunted in several ways, such as shadows without bodies, inanimate objects moving (i.e.: a toy doll opens its eyes without being touched, moving furniture, moving swing), reflections while no-one is there and people in a family picture moving.

Charts

References

Billy Talent songs
2003 debut singles
Songs written by Ian D'Sa
Songs written by Benjamin Kowalewicz
Songs written by Jonathan Gallant
Songs written by Aaron Solowoniuk
Song recordings produced by Gavin Brown (musician)
2003 songs